This is a list of awards and nominations received by South Korean pop rock band CNBLUE. The band debuted in 2009 in Japan and 2010 in South Korea with four members, under FNC Entertainment.

Awards

Golden Disc Awards
Golden Disc Awards is an awards show founded in 1986 that is presented annually by the Music Industry Association of Korea for outstanding achievements in the music industry in South Korea.

Seoul Music Awards
Seoul Music Awards is an awards show founded in 1990 that is presented annually by the Sports Seoul for outstanding achievements in the music industry in South Korea.

Mnet Asian Music Awards
Mnet Asian Music Awards (abbreviated as a MAMA), formerly "M.net KM Music Festival" (MKMF) (1999 - 2008), is a major K-pop music award show that is held by Mnet Media annually in South Korea.

Mnet 20's Choice Awards
The Mnet 20's Choice Awards is a major music awards show that is held annually in South Korea, organized by CJ E&M through its Mnet channel.

Melon Music Awards
Melon Music Awards is a major music awards show that is held by Melon Music Site and MBC Plus Media annually in South Korea. It is known for only calculating digital sales and online votes to judge winners.

Gaon Chart Music Awards
The Gaon Chart Music Awards is a major music awards show that is held annually in South Korea by the national music record chart Gaon Chart.

Cyworld Digital Music Awards
Cyworld Digital Music Awards is based on the BGM chart that started in 2006 the first Republic of Korea, No.1 representative of the Digital Music Awards . The Winners Chosen By Combining Both Digital Sales & Online Background Music Of The Cyworld Users.

Other awards

Other accolades

State honors

Listicles

Notes

References

External links
  
  

CNBLUE
Awards